= Sankari division =

Sankari division is a revenue division in the Salem district of Tamil Nadu, India.
